Atlant Stadium is a multi-purpose stadium in Novopolotsk, Belarus. It is currently used mostly for football matches and is the home ground of Naftan Novopolotsk. The stadium was built in 1970 and holds 4,520 people.

References

External links
Stadium profile at Naftan website
Stadium profile at pressball.by

Football venues in Belarus
Buildings and structures in Vitebsk Region
Multi-purpose stadiums in Belarus